Paolo Briguglia (born 27 May 1974) is an Italian film, stage and television actor.

Life and career 
Born in Palermo, Sicily, Briguglia studied at the Accademia Nazionale di Arte Drammatica Silvio D'Amico in Rome, graduating in 1998. He made his film debut in 2000, in Roberto Andò's  The Prince's Manuscript.   His first main role was the soldier Serra in the Enzo Monteleone's 2002 war-drama El Alamein - The Line of Fire,  and for this role Briguglia won a Globo d'oro for best new actor.

Selected filmography 
The Prince's Manuscript (2000)
One Hundred Steps (2000)
Julius Caesar (2002)
El Alamein - The Line of Fire (2002)
St. Francis (2002)
Good Morning, Night (2003)
Stay with Me (2004)
But When Do the Girls Get Here? (2005)
Our Land (2006)
La buona battaglia – Don Pietro Pappagallo (2006)
Era mio fratello (2007)
 Caravaggio (2007)
Non pensarci (2008)
The Sicilian Girl (2009)
Bets and Wedding Dresses (2009)
Baarìa (2009)
Basilicata Coast to Coast (2010)
L'amore fa male (2011)
 The Complexity of Happiness (2015)

References

External links 

1974 births
Italian male stage actors
Italian male film actors
Italian male television actors
Living people
Italian comedians
Male actors from Palermo
Accademia Nazionale di Arte Drammatica Silvio D'Amico alumni